Khirbat Al-Taqa, was a Palestinian Arab village in the District of Baysan. It was depopulated by the Israel Defense Forces during the 1948 Arab-Israeli War on May 15, 1948, under Operation Gideon. It was located 14 km north of Baysan nearby Wadi al-Bira which powered several mills in the village.

History
It was classified as a hamlet in the Palestine Index Gazetteer.

Following the war the area was incorporated into the State of Israel and the land was left undeveloped.

References

Bibliography

External links
Welcome To al-Taqa, Khirbat
Khirbat al-Taqa,  Zochrot
Survey of Western Palestine, map 9:   IAA, Wikimedia commons

Arab villages depopulated during the 1948 Arab–Israeli War